The 1893 Kentucky State College Blue and White football team represented Kentucky State College—now known as the University of Kentucky—as an independent during the 1893 college football season. Led by John A. Thompson in his first and only season as head coach, the Blue and White compiled a record of 5–2–1.

Schedule

References

Kentucky State College
Kentucky Wildcats football seasons
Kentucky State College Blue and White football